The Pskem or Piskom is a river of Tashkent Region in Uzbekistan in the Pskem Mountains.

The origins of the river Pskem are in the  glaciers of the Talas Alatau range in Kazakhstan. In the upper reaches of the river it flows through a narrow rocky gorge, and then travels more than  through the Pskem Valley. The river valley is bounded by Ugam Range (north) and Pskem Range (south). On the banks of the river in the valley are thickets of shrubs and apple, pear, apricot and plum trees, along with small groves of walnut. The river banks are home to notable populations of porcupine, fox, marmots, wild pigs and brown bear, as well as many species of birds.

The river empties into the Lake Charvak, which is drained by the river Chirchiq. Its tributaries are the Aksarsoy and other rivers. Tourism has increased in the area in recent years with rafting and kayaking on the river.

References

Rivers of Uzbekistan
Tashkent Region